KTNC (1230 AM) is a radio station broadcasting an oldies music format. Licensed to Falls City, Nebraska, United States, the station is currently owned by KNZA Inc. and features programming from Westwood One.

References

External links

Oldies radio stations in the United States
TNC
Richardson County, Nebraska
Radio stations established in 1957
1957 establishments in Nebraska